Religion and agriculture have been closely associated since neolithic times and the development of early Orphic religions based upon fertility and the seasons.

See also
 Agricultural spiritualism
 Christianity and agriculture
 Earth goddess
 Fall of man
 Fertility rite
 Human sacrifice
 List of fertility deities

References

External links 
 Bernard Stiegler, Take Care
 Paul Hanley (2006) The Spirit of Agriculture.  George Ronald, Oxford. 226 pp

Agriculture in society
Religion and society